Antonio Dechent (born 1960) is a Spanish actor. Born in Seville, he is specialised in supporting roles.

Selected filmography

Theatre
 Queipo, el sueño de un general (2010-2011)
 Estado de sitio (obra de teatro)|Estado de sitio (2012)
 Tomar partido (2012)
 La voz Humana (2013)
 La extraña pareja (16 September 2014)

Accolades

References

External links
 

Male actors from Andalusia
Spanish male film actors
1960 births
Living people
20th-century Spanish male actors
21st-century Spanish male actors
Spanish male television actors